simPRO is a private SaaS company that provides cloud-based job and project management software to those in field service and trade contracting industries. The company has customers and partners in Australia, New Zealand, the United Kingdom and the United States. simPRO offices are located in each of these countries, with the most recent office opening for operation in Colorado in the United States.

History 
simPRO was founded in 2002, after electrical business owner Steve Bradshaw approached software engineering student Vaughan McKillop about creating a website for his electrical contracting business. They realised that the new tool could also be offered to other customers. The company first started trading as Acorn Software and Service Management Pty Ltd in 2003, then changed its name to simPRO Software in 2011 and simPRO in 2017.

In October 2016, simPRO received US$31 million in capital funding from New York-based growth equity firm Level Equity. It marked the first time the company had accepted external investment since its founding.

References

Cloud applications
Management systems